Route 24 may refer to:

Route 24 (MTA Maryland), a bus route in the suburbs of Baltimore, Maryland
London Buses route 24

See also
List of highways numbered 24

24